Charlie Gallagher (25 December 1937 – 24 July 1989) was a Gaelic footballer who played for the Cootehill Celtic club and the Cavan county team.

Playing career
Gallagher regularly topped the nation’s scoring charts in the 1960s. He debut for Cavan in 1955 at the age of 17 years, against Sligo in the National Football League. He won Ulster Senior Football Championship medals in 1962, 1964, 1967 and 1969. He also won an Ulster Junior Football Championship medal in 1962. He was captain of Cavan in 1967 and 1969. He won Railway Cup medals with Ulster in 1964, 1965, 1966 and 1968. He won a Cú Chulainn Award in 1964. His older brother Brian won an All-Ireland medal in 1952.

Honours
Cavan
Ulster Junior Football Championship (1): 1962
Ulster Senior Football Championship (4): 1962, 1964, 1967 (c), 1969 (c)

Cootehill Celtic
Cavan Senior Football Championship (2): 1954, 1955
Cavan Intermediate Football Championship (1): 1971
Cavan Junior Football Championship (1): 1969

Ulster
Railway Cup (4): 1964, 1965, 1966, 1968 (c)

UCD
Sigerson Cup (1): 1960

St Patrick's College
MacRory Cup (1): 1955

Individual 
Cú Chulainn Award (1): 1964

Other honours
 Number 94 in The 125 greatest stars of the GAA
 He is seventh in the all-time top Ulster scorers chart with 10–142 (172 points).

Death
He died from drowning near his home in Cootehill, County Cavan, in July 1989.

References

1937 births
1989 deaths
Accidental deaths in the Republic of Ireland
Cavan inter-county Gaelic footballers
Deaths by drowning
Irish dentists
20th-century dentists